The men's normal hill individual ski jumping competition for the 1964 Winter Olympics was held at Seefeld. It occurred on 31 January.

Results

References

Ski jumping at the 1964 Winter Olympics